Tim Martin (born April 12, 1976) is a former American football lineman who played eight seasons in the Arena Football League with the Oklahoma Wranglers, Dallas Desperados, New Orleans VooDoo, Grand Rapids Rampage and San Jose SaberCats. He played college football at the University of Tulsa and attended Sequoyah High School in Claremore, Oklahoma. He was also a member of the Miami Dolphins, Barcelona Dragons, Chicago Enforcers and New York Dragons.

College football
Martin played college football for the Tulsa Golden Hurricane. He was three-year starter for the Hurricane, recording career totals of 177 tackles and five sacks. He started every game his senior year in 1998 while compiling three sacks and 60 tackles.

Professional career

Barcelona Dragons
Martin played for the Barcelona Dragons of NFL Europe in 2000.

Miami Dolphins
Martin signed with the Miami Dolphins on July 25, 2000. He was released by the Dolphins on August 26, 2000.

Oklahoma Wranglers
Martin played for the Oklahoma Wranglers from 2000 to 2001. He was placed on Other League Exempt on November 16, 2000.

Chicago Enforcers
Martin played for the Chicago Enforcers of the XFL in 2001.

New York Dragons
Martin was selected by the New York Dragons in the AFL dispersal draft. He was only a member of the New York Dragons during the 2002 off-season.

Dallas Desperados
Martin was traded to the Dallas Desperados on February 20, 2002. He played for the team from 2002 to 2003.

New Orleans VooDoo
Martin signed with the New Orleans VooDoo on October 16, 2003. He played for the VooDoo from 2004 to 2005, earning Second Team All-Arena honors in 2004.

Grand Rapids Rampage
Martin signed with the Grand Rapids Rampage on October 21, 2005 and played for the team during the 2006 season.

San Jose SaberCats
Martin was signed by the San Jose SaberCats on February 4, 2007 and played for the team during the 2007 season.

References

External links
Just Sports Stats

Living people
1976 births
Players of American football from Oklahoma
American football offensive linemen
American football defensive linemen
Tulsa Golden Hurricane football players
Barcelona Dragons players
Oklahoma Wranglers players
Chicago Enforcers players
Dallas Desperados players
New Orleans VooDoo players
Grand Rapids Rampage players
San Jose SaberCats players
People from Claremore, Oklahoma